The Dr. James Alvis Beavers House is a historic house in Cuba, Sumter County, Alabama.  The one-and-a-half-story wood-frame house was built by Stephen M. Potts between 1854 and 1857.  Initially built in a simpler style, the house was modified in succeeding decades into a picturesque combination of the Greek Revival and Gothic Revival styles.  It was purchased by Dr. James Alvis Beavers in 1898.  The Beavers family retained ownership until 1980, when it was acquired at auction by the Charles Munoz family.  It was added to the National Register of Historic Places on August 31, 2000.

References

National Register of Historic Places in Sumter County, Alabama
Houses on the National Register of Historic Places in Alabama
Greek Revival houses in Alabama
Carpenter Gothic architecture in Alabama
Houses in Sumter County, Alabama
Carpenter Gothic houses in the United States
1857 establishments in Alabama